Bettys and Taylors of Harrogate, also known as Bettys and Taylors Group Limited, is a family company based in Yorkshire, England. The company's brands are Bettys (with no apostrophe), Taylors of Harrogate (also with no possessive apostrophe), and Yorkshire Tea. Bettys Café Tea Rooms are traditional tea rooms serving traditional meals with influences from both Switzerland and Yorkshire. Taylors of Harrogate was a family tea and coffee merchant company, founded in 1886, which blended Yorkshire Tea and Taylors of Harrogate Coffee; the owners of Bettys acquired Taylors in 1962. The chairman of the company is Clare Morrow, a former journalist.

Yorkshire Tea was introduced by Charles Edward Taylor and his brother in 1883, when they created their company CE Taylor & Co., whose name was later shortened to Taylor's. The brothers later opened "Tea Kiosks" in the Yorkshire towns of Harrogate and Ilkley, and in 1962, local tea room competitor Betty's took over Taylor's, renamed it Taylors of Harrogate and formed Bettys and Taylors Group, which is still owned by the family of Fredrick Belmont, who founded Betty's Tea Rooms. The group now uses the Bettys and Taylors brands in a number of industries, including Yorkshire Tea and Taylors Coffee Merchants under the Taylors of Harrogate name, and Bettys Tea Rooms, Bettys Cookery School and Bettys Confectionery under the Bettys brand.

In 2007 Bettys and Taylors was 72nd in a list of "the 100 best companies to work for" compiled by The Sunday Times.

History 

The first Bettys tea room was opened on Cambridge Crescent in Harrogate, West Riding of Yorkshire, by Frederick Belmont, a Swiss confectioner, in July 1919. The Harrogate tea rooms moved to their current position on Parliament Street in 1976.

Belmont arrived in England at King's Cross railway station and boarded a train to Bradford as much through luck as judgement, for he spoke very limited English and could not recall the address (or even the city) to which he was supposed to be heading. In 1922, Belmont opened a craft bakery in Harrogate, which meant it was possible to open more tea rooms, including branches in Bradford, Leeds and York (the latter, the biggest branch, opened in 1937).

The origin of the Bettys name is unknown.  The company's website suggests four possibilities: Elizabeth Bowes-Lyon, mother of Queen Elizabeth II (which seems unlikely as she did not come to public prominence until marrying the Duke of York in 1923); Betty Lupton, former manager of the Harrogate Spa; the daughter of a previous occupant of the Harrogate premises who died of tuberculosis; or a small child who interrupted a meeting at which the choice of name was being discussed.

The merger with Taylors of Harrogate (founded 1886) came about in 1962.

In 1986 Bettys by Post was developed, initially a mail-order company, but later moving online. In 2001 Bettys opened a cookery school on the same site as their craft bakery, at Plumpton Park near Harrogate.

Bettys marked their 90th anniversary in July 2009 with afternoon tea of patisseries, fancies and cakes from the past served by waitresses dressed in period costumes.

Tea rooms 
There are five Bettys tea rooms, all of which comprise a shop as well as a café. The locations of the tea rooms are:
Bettys Harrogate – Parliament Street, Harrogate (opened 1976)
Bettys York – St Helen's Square, York (opened 1937)
Bettys Northallerton – High Street, Northallerton (opened 1971)
Bettys Ilkley – The Grove, Ilkley (opened 1964)
Bettys Harlow Carr – RHS Harlow Carr, Harrogate (opened 2004)

The St Helen's Square café in York was inspired by the RMS Queen Mary cruise liner, and became particularly popular during the Second World War, when the basement "Bettys Bar" became a favourite with hundreds of American and Canadian "Bomber Boys" who were stationed around York. 'Bettys Mirror', on which many of them engraved their signatures with a diamond pen, remains on display at the branch.

In 1962, Bettys joined forces with another Yorkshire business, family tea and coffee merchants, Taylors of Harrogate, who still manufacture Yorkshire Tea and Taylors of Harrogate Coffee.

From 1930 until 1974, there was a Bettys tea room in Commercial Street, Leeds, in premises now (as of February 2008) used as a mobile phone shop. There was also a tea room in Bradford, on Darley Street, which first opened in 1922 and closed in 1974.

In March 2021, it was announced that the Bettys Stonegate café would be closing, with the shop remaining open. The branch opened in 1965, and was run by Taylors of Harrogate before becoming a Bettys in 1999, when it was known as Little Bettys. In 2011, it was rebranded as Bettys Stonegate. 

Bettys have refused many times to open a branch outside Yorkshire, saying that keeping Bettys small means that a watchful eye can be kept on every detail.

Publications 
The Bettys name is attached to several books, sold mainly through the tea rooms:
 Hearts Tarts & Rascals, Jonathan Wild 
 A Year of Family Recipes, Lesley Wild
 Who Was Betty?, various contributors

See also
 List of tea houses

References

1919 establishments in England
British companies established in 1919
Restaurants established in 1919
Food brands of the United Kingdom
Companies based in Harrogate
Tourist attractions in Harrogate
Tea houses of the United Kingdom
Yorkshire cuisine
Tea brands in the United Kingdom
Tea companies of the United Kingdom
British brands
British Royal Warrant holders
Fair trade brands